Chozas means huts in Spanish and may refer to

Surname
Eduardo Chozas (born 1960), Spanish road racing cyclist
Patricia Chozas y Chozas (born 1974), Mexican politician 

Municipalities in Spain
Calera y Chozas
Chozas de Abajo
Chozas de Canales
CD Chozas de Canales, a defunct football team based in Chozas de Canales

Other
Choza Formation, a geologic formation in Texas, U.S.